Pakida is a 2014 Indian Malayalam-language road movie directed by Sunil Karyattukara, written by Rajesh Rajendran and Sreejith N., and starring Asif Ali and Biju Menon, with Malavika Nair, Shine Tom Chacko, Aju Varghese, Vishnu Raghav, and Anjo Jose in supporting roles. The film was released on 14 February 2014.

Plot

Five friends: Aadhi, Rafeeq, C. P., Pauly, and Balu are graduates in automobile engineering and are close to each other. Aadhi has a love affair. He meets a middle-aged man George Koshy Anthrapper who walks with the help of a walking stick. Aadhi accompanies Anthrapper on a journey to Rameswaram. They come across Sunny and a Tamil girl Kani.

Cast
 Asif Ali as Aadhi
 Biju Menon as George Koshy Anthraper
 Shine Tom Chacko as Sunny
 Malavika Nair as Kani
 Aju Varghese as Maathan
 Vishnu Raghav as Rafik
 Anjo Jose
 Sajid Yahiya as Sherif
 Apoorva Bose as Pooja
 Renji Panicker Sreekumar
 P. Balachandran as Adhi's father
 Balaji Sharma as Xaiver
 Assim Jamal as Stephen

Production
It is the second movie of Sunil Karyattukara after Chacko Randaaman. Filming was carried in Tamil Nadu and Kochi, Kerala.

Soundtrack
The music was composed by Bijibal, with lyrics by Rafeeq Ahamed, Jophy Tharakan, and Nillai Jayanthi.

Release
The film was released in theatres on 14 February 2014.

References

External links
 

2014 films
Indian thriller films
2010s Malayalam-language films
2014 thriller films